Moshtaqin (also Romanized as Moshtaqīn; also known as Meshgīn Ḩaq, Meshgīn Ḩaqq, Meshkandzhik, Meshkanjik, Meshkīnjeq, and Meshkīnjīk) is a village in Yurchi-ye Gharbi Rural District, Kuraim District, Nir County, Ardabil Province, Iran. At the 2006 census, its population was 319, in 76 families.

People are from 3 clans: 1-Ongouti 2-Taleshi 3- Seyyeddlar

References 

Tageo

Towns and villages in Nir County